Claude Dormy (c.1562 – 30 November 1626 in Paris) was a French Roman Catholic priest and bishop of Boulogne-sur-Mer from 1600 until his death. He was the nephew of Claude-André Dormy, who had also been bishop of Boulogne.

Life
He was a monk of Cluny Abbey and prior of Saint-Martin-des-Champs Priory.  During his time as bishop he allowed the Capuchins to set up a monastery in Boulogne, laying the foundation stone of their church in 1618. He also set up an Ursuline monastery in the city in 1624.

Sources
Eugène Van Drival, Histoire des évêques de Boulogne, Boulogne-sur-Mer, 1852

17th-century French Roman Catholic bishops
1562 births
1626 deaths
Bishops of Boulogne
Prisoners of the Bastille